John Anthony (born 3 December 1944) is an English music producer. He has worked with Van der Graaf Generator, Genesis, Queen, Roxy Music and Peter Hammill.

Career 
Anthony was born in North Shields, then in Northumberland now in North Tyneside. He started out in 1966 as a DJ in Windsor, Berkshire, where two years later he sang briefly with two bands: the Soul Agents, and Hogsnort Rupert and the Good Good Band. After moving to London, he worked as a club DJ at The Roundhouse, the UFO Club, and Middle Earth, and then in 1968 at the Speakeasy. After having produced and recorded a demonstration disc for Yes in 1968, he started his years as a music producer, eventually producing all the acts in the 1971 "Six Bob Tour", featuring Genesis,  Lindisfarne, and Van der Graaf Generator. He had a saying for producing music: "There's one right way to do an album, and four hundred wrong ones."

In 1969 as an artists and repertoire (A&R) man for Mercury Records in London, Anthony was asked by Lou Reizner to produce an album by Van der Graaf Generator. Tony Stratton-Smith, the manager of VdGG, was so impressed with the resulting The Aerosol Grey Machine that he hired Anthony as an A&R man and staff producer at the newly formed Charisma Records. In late 1971 Anthony formed Neptune Productions, his own production company with the owners of Trident Studios and signed Queen to Neptune in late 1971.

Anthony moved to the US in 1975 and became head of A&R at A&M Records in New York.

Credits

References

Bibliography 
 Bronson, Paul (2003). The Billboard Book of Number One Hits, 5th ed. Billboard Books.
 Christopulos, J., & Smart, P. (2005). Van der Graaf Generator, The Book: A History of the Band Van der Graaf Generator 1967 to 1978. Phil and Jim Publishers.
 Frith, Simon (1981). Sound Effects: Youth, Leisure, and the Politics of Rock 'n' Roll. Pantheon Books.
 Thompson, Dave (2004). Turn It On Again: Peter Gabriel, Phil Collins & Genesis. Hal Leonard Corporation.

1944 births
Living people
Musicians from Tyne and Wear
English record producers
People from North Shields
Engineers from Tyne and Wear